Zero Degree is a 1998 postmodern, transgressive, lipogrammatic novel by Tamil author Charu Nivedita, later translated into Malayalam and English.

Awards and accolades
Zero Degree was longlisted for the 2013 edition of Jan Michalski Prize.
Zero Degree was inducted into the prestigious '50 Writers, 50 Books - The Best of Indian Fiction', published by HarperCollins.
 Zero Degree was selected as one of the fifteen incredible Indian novels. 
The Sunday Guardian considers Zero Degree an important novel in Metafiction genre.

Literary contemporaries on Zero Degree
In his foreword to the Malayalam translation of Zero Degree, Paul Zacharia wrote, "It is like an open experimental laboratory. Amidst the smoke, noxious vapors, and beautiful imagery, I experienced a wondrous journey."
 Tarun Tejpal opines that Zero Degree is remarkable for its experimental voice and its varying and shifting tonalities. 
Anil Menon considers Zero Degree bold and ambitious. He posits that the ancient fascination with language and reality continues to burst through the crust in Charu Nivedita’s works.
Noted translator Jason Grunebaum considers Zero Degree wildly exciting and complains that Charu does not write in Hindi, so that he would translate Charu's works to English.
Poet Vivek Narayanan says about Zero Degree: "I think we should take Zero Degree not just as a playful, ironic “postmodern” novel but as a novel of oppositions and contradictions: a deeply autobiographical novel where the self has been scattered, an ironic pastiche novel that speaks to raw experience, a defiantly cosmopolitan novel than nonetheless pins a very particular kind of schizophrenic rage that perhaps—I could be wrong—any Tamilian will immediately recognise."

Universities on Zero Degree
 Zero Degree was on the curriculum in Spring 2010 in a Comparative World Literature course, taught by Jordan Smith, at California State University, Long Beach (CSULB).
 University of Rochester has included Zero Degree in its translation program.
 The Malayalam translation of Zero Degree is in the curriculum for postgraduate students at the Mahatma Gandhi University, Kottayam.

Translations
 Zero Degree was translated into Malayalam in 1999 by Dr G.Balasubrahmanian and Dr P.M.Gireesh.
 It was translated into English in 2008 by Pritham K. Chakravarthy and Rakesh Khanna.
 Further translations into Telugu, Hindi and Spanish are on the anvil.

Reviews
 Review of Zero Degree in Tehelka
 Review of Zero Degree by Pallavi Rao
 Review of Zero Degree in the Times of India
 Review of Zero Degree in The New Sunday Express

Special feature
Keeping with the numerological theme of Zero Degree, the only numbers expressed in either words or symbols are numerologically equivalent to nine (with the exception of two chapters). This Oulipian ban includes the very common word one (only in Tamil edition).

See also
Constrained writing

References

External links 
An excerpt from Zero Degree

Tamil novels
Lipograms
1998 novels
Metafiction
1998 Indian novels